A Steam Train Passes is a 1974 Australian short film set in the 1940s, featuring the construction and operation of locomotive 3801.

Plot
The opening sequence is a 1943 black-and-white Cinesound newsreel Monarch of the Rails showing the locomotive being built. The film then changes to colour and shows the locomotive at the Enfield Locomotive Depot, then the home of the New South Wales Rail Transport Museum. The fireman lights the fire and the driver inspects the locomotive. When ready the locomotive is turned on the turntable.

The main part of the film shows the train travelling through the New South Wales countryside through disparate locations including the Sydney suburbs, Hawkesbury River Railway Bridge, Ten Tunnels Deviation, Polona signal box Blayney station and the Picton-Mittagong loop line. These scenes are interspersed with vignettes of life the 1940s including a travelling salesman, a country wedding in a church at Georges Plains, and two soldiers heading off to war, having their last drink in a pub, the Hotel Alexander in Rydal. All linked in to the train journey.

There is no commentary, and most of the audio is live sound of the train, with some overlaid with original music by George Dreyfus. Cinematography was by Academy Award winner, Dean Semler (Dances With Wolves).

Cast
There are no speaking parts so the actors are not credited. The only "acting" credits are for the driver Chris O'Sullivan and fireman Harold Fowler, both employees of the Public Transport Commission.  Cecil Barnes is the fireman in the last scenes of the film.  He and the driver in that scene are intended to be 'earlier' incarnations of the credited driver and fireman.

Reception
A Steam Train Passes is one of Film Australia's most successful films. It has won many awards and is generally regarded as Australia's finest railway film.

Awards include:
1974 Australian Film Institute Awards, Silver Kodak Award for Photography (Documentary Category)
1974 Australian Film Institute Awards, Bronze Medallion for Dean Semler
1975 US Industrial Film Festival, Silver Screen Award - 2nd prize, History & Biography
1975 Chicago International Film Festival, Certificate of Merit Documentary Section 9, History
1975 San Francisco International Film Festival, Special Jury Award - Communication Section
1975 Cork International Film Festival, Statuette of St. Fincarr, Category D (Short Fiction)
1975 Melbourne International Film Festival, Special Award Short Film.
1975 Australian Cinematographers Society Awards, Golden Tripod.

Film footage
Footage from this film has become almost stock footage for other productions requiring footage of a steam train. Footage has been used in Sarah, The Winds of Jarrah, Sirens, Rabbit-Proof Fence, True Believers, Curtin and several documentaries.

The original negative is preserved at the National Film and Sound Archive.

Restoration
In 2012, the National Film and Sound Archive restored and digitally remastered the film. Film Australia made it available on YouTube on 27 August of that year.

References

External links

 on the Film Australia YouTube channel.
Two excerpts at Film Australia's On the Rails site (select clip title)
3801 at Georges Plains, 4 July 1974 during filming of A Steam Train Passes, photo by Dennis Rittson
A Steam Train Passes at the National Film and Sound Archive
A Steam Train Passes at Oz Movies

1974 films
Articles containing video clips
Australian short documentary films
Rail transport films
1970s English-language films